Meredith Minkler (born September 23, 1946) is an American public health researcher who is emeritus Professor at the University of California, Berkeley. She is known for her work on community-based participatory research and its use in public policy, criminal justice reform and democratizing access to food.

Early life and education 
Minkler was born in San Francisco. Her mother worked in medical records and her father was in education. She was an undergraduate student at the University of California, Berkeley, where she majored in social sciences. She remained at the University of California, Berkeley for doctoral studies, where she investigated American and Indian perspectives on the role of United States' family planning advisors working in India.

Research and career 
Whilst Professor of Health and Social Behavior, Minkler oversaw the graduate program in public health, and founded the university's Center on Ageing. She worked on the development of community-based participatory research programs, particularly to study and address health equity and social justice. Minkler works with low-income young and old people, women of color and people who were formerly incarcerated.

Minkler was selected by the University of California, Berkeley as one of their most pioneering public health researchers. She was selected by the School of Public Health as one of their Women Changemakers.

Selected publications

Books

References 

1946 births
Living people
American public health doctors
University of California, Berkeley alumni
University of California, Berkeley faculty
American medical researchers
Women medical researchers
20th-century American physicians
20th-century American academics
20th-century American women physicians
21st-century American physicians
21st-century American academics
21st-century American women physicians
Women public health doctors